Tiapoum Department is a department of Sud-Comoé Region in Comoé District, Ivory Coast. In 2021, its population was 67,941 and its seat is the settlement of Tiapoum. The sub-prefectures of the department are Noé, Nouamou, and Tiapoum.

History
Tiapoum Department was created in 2008 as a second-level subdivision via a split-off from Adiaké Department. At its creation, it was part of Sud-Comoé Region.

In 2011, districts were introduced as new first-level subdivisions of Ivory Coast. At the same time, regions were reorganised and became second-level subdivisions and all departments were converted into third-level subdivisions. At this time, Tiapoum Department remained part of the retained Sud-Comoé Region in the new Comoé District.

Notes

Departments of Sud-Comoé
2008 establishments in Ivory Coast
States and territories established in 2008